West Arawe is an Austronesian dialect chain of West New Britain, Papua New Guinea. The principal varieties are Apalik, Gimi, Aiklep, and Arawe proper (Solong).

References

Arawe languages
Languages of West New Britain Province